The Twin Falls (Kundjeyhmi: Gungkurdul) is a cascade waterfall on the South Alligator River that descends over the Arnhem Land escarpment within the UNESCO World Heritagelisted Kakadu National Park in the Northern Territory of Australia.  In 1980, The Twin Falls area was listed on the now-defunct Register of the National Estate.

Location and features
The falls are accessible by four wheel drive trail,  from the Kakadu Highway and near to Jim Jim Falls.

The waterfall features within the leading one hundred images selected in 2012 by Australian Traveller magazine to promote Australia as a tourism destination.

Facilities adjacent to the waterfall include a carpark, picnic area, public toilets, and a shaded area.

See also

 List of waterfalls of the Northern Territory
 Protected areas of the Northern Territory

References

External links

Waterfalls of the Northern Territory
Kakadu National Park
Arnhem Land
Cascade waterfalls
Northern Territory places listed on the defunct Register of the National Estate